FK Babi is a football club based in the city of Štip, Republic of Macedonia. They currently play in the Macedonian Third League.

History
The club was founded in 1994.

References

External links
Club info at MacedonianFootball 
Football Federation of Macedonia 

Babi
Sport in Štip
Association football clubs established in 1994
1994 establishments in the Republic of Macedonia